The state governments in Malaysia are the governments ruling the 13 states in the federation of Malaysia. All 13 states adopts the Westminster Parliamentary system and each has a unicameral state legislative assembly. Each of the States of Malaya is run by an EXCO, while Sabah and Sarawak have their respective Cabinet and Ministry. The state government structure in all 13 states is similar to the government system of the federal government of Malaysia and that the state legislatures consist of only a single chamber.

Heads of state
The heads of state for the 9 monarchical states are their respective monarchs (7 out of them Sultans). The 9 states are Johor, Negeri Sembilan, Pahang, Selangor, Perak, Kedah, Terengganu, Kelantan and Perlis. The heads of state for Penang, Malacca, Sabah and Sarawak are their respective Yang di-Pertua Negeri sometimes referred to as governor. All 13 heads of state forms the Conference of Rulers but only the 9 monarchs can become the Yang di-Pertuan Agong (King of Malaysia). The role of the heads of state are largely ceremonial other than the power to appoint the chief minister or menteri besar (according to the state constitution) and to withhold consent to dissolve the state legislature. The heads of state are required by convention to give their approval or assent to every legislation passed by the state legislature.

Heads of government

The Head of Government for the 13 states in Malaysia is either a Minister (Menteri Besar) or Chief Minister (Ketua Menteri), depending on whether their Head of State is a Sultan or Yang di-Pertua Negeri.

Powers and functions

Pursuant to Article 73-79 of the Federal Constitution, the state legislature is empowered to legislate on matters such as land matters, public works, local government, agriculture and forestry, Islamic law and public holidays. Pursuant to Article 80 of the Federal Constitution, the state executive in turn has administrative power over all matters which the state legislature may legislate under the constitution. Federalism in Malaysia is quite strong whereby the federal government retains by far more powers compared to the respective state governments. This is also reflected in the budget allocation towards the state and federal government.

State government

See also
 Government of Malaysia
 Local government in Malaysia
 Chief Ministers in Malaysia
 State legislative assemblies of Malaysia
 List of current heads of states and governments of Malaysia

References

 
M